Sam Hignett (1885 –  1933) was an English footballer who played for Liverpool between 1906 and 1908. Playing at right-half, he made one appearance for the reds, against Sunderland on 12 October 1907. He is listed in some sources as being named Alan Hignett.

See also
Alan Hignett, who also played one game for Liverpool in the 1960s.

References

External links
Profile at LFCHistory.net

1885 births
1933 deaths
Liverpool F.C. players
English Football League players
English footballers
Association football wing halves